Jorge Luis Crusellas Álvarez (born July 28, 1966 in Pinar del Río) is a retired male sprinter from Cuba. He claimed a gold medal in the Men's 4x400 metres relay at the 1995 Pan American Games in Mar del Plata, Argentina.  Crusellas set his personal best in the men's 400 metres (45.65) in 1995.

References

1966 births
Living people
Cuban male sprinters
Athletes (track and field) at the 1995 Pan American Games
Athletes (track and field) at the 1999 Pan American Games
Athletes (track and field) at the 1996 Summer Olympics
Olympic athletes of Cuba
Pan American Games gold medalists for Cuba
Pan American Games medalists in athletics (track and field)
Goodwill Games medalists in athletics
Central American and Caribbean Games gold medalists for Cuba
Competitors at the 1998 Central American and Caribbean Games
Central American and Caribbean Games medalists in athletics
Competitors at the 1994 Goodwill Games
Medalists at the 1995 Pan American Games
People from Pinar del Río
20th-century Cuban people